The 2002 FIA Sportscar Championship Estoril was the second race for the 2002 FIA Sportscar Championship season held at the Autódromo do Estoril and ran a distance of two hours, thirty minutes.  It took place on April 14, 2002.

Official results

Class winners in bold.  Cars failing to complete 75% of winner's distance marked as Not Classified (NC).

Statistics
 Pole Position - #14 Team Oreca - 1:29.401
 Fastest Lap - #14 Team Oreca - 1:31.442

E
6 Hours of Estoril
FIA Sportscar